Sir John Hayward  (c. 1591 – April 1636) was an English politician and landowner. He was MP for Bridgnorth in 1621 and for Saltash in 1626, as well as High Sheriff of Kent in 1623 and of Montgomeryshire in 1632.

Personal details
John Hayward was born in 1591, second surviving son of Sir Rowland Hayward (1520-1593) and his second wife Catherine Smythe. Originally from an old Shropshire family, his father was a wealthy merchant and twice Lord Mayor of London.

In 1615, Hayward inherited his elder brother George's estates in Acton Burnell; around 1624, he moved to Hollingbourne in Kent and married his recently widowed cousin Anne, mother of Sir Michael Livesey, a regicide who approved the Execution of Charles I in January 1649. They had no children and when he died in 1636, he was buried next to his father in St Alphege London Wall. His will records him as being resident in Rochester, Kent.

References

Sources
 
 
 

1590s births
1636 deaths
English MPs 1621–1622
Politicians from Shropshire
People from Rochester, Kent
English MPs 1626
Members of the Parliament of England for Saltash
Alumni of Emmanuel College, Cambridge
High Sheriffs of Kent
High Sheriffs of Montgomeryshire
People from Hollingbourne